Walkelin (died 1098) was the first Norman bishop of Winchester.

Life
Walkelin was of noble birth and related to William the Conqueror, whom he served as a royal chaplain. Before the Norman Conquest he had probably been a canon at Rouen Cathedral. He took up office at Winchester in 1070, having been nominated on 23 May and consecrated on 30 May.  A year later, in 1071, Abbot Ealdred of Abingdon, who was being held for support of insurrection, died in Walkelin's custody, and the following year he signed the Accord of Winchester, formulated in the city.

Nepotism
Walkelin made his brother Simeon the Prior of Winchester and then influenced Simeon being made Abbot of Ely in 1082, where he began the new Ely Abbey in 1093 (the same year that Walkelin completed his cathedral at Winchester) before dying the following year. Walkelin also advanced his nephew Gerard, Archbishop of York.

Cathedral builder
Walkelin began work on a new cathedral church, the current Winchester Cathedral, in 1079. His transepts and crypt, though little else, are retained in the present building. King William II granted Walkelin half a hide in the Isle of Wight with license to search for and excavate stone for his new cathedral "throughout the plain and the forest: if the forest is sufficiently small that the horns of a deer may be seen passing through it".

William I also granted Walkelin as much timber for the building and its scaffolding from the Forest of Hempage Wood (on the Old Alresford Road in Hampshire) as his carpenters could take in four days and nights. However, in the words of the Winchester annalist:
"the Bishop collected an innumerable troop of carpenters and within the assigned time cut down the whole wood and carried it off to Winchester. [Soon afterwards the King], passing by Hempage, was struck with amazement and cried out, "Am I bewitched or have I taken leave of my senses? Had I not once a most delectable wood upon this spot?" But when he understood what had happened, he was violently enraged. Then the Bishop put on a shabby vestment and made his way to the King's feet, humbly begging to resign the episcopate and merely requesting that he might retain his royal friendship and chaplaincy. The King was thus appeased, only observing, "I was as much too liberal in my grant as you were too greedy in availing yourself of it."

The new cathedral was completed in 1093.  Walkelin had
caused [its] tower ... to be made as it is still to be seen, (At the annalist's time, though the present tower is a later Norman construction) and rebuilt it, with its four columns, from the foundations in the middle of the choir.

On 8 April that year, in the presence of nearly all of the bishops and abbots of England, the monks removed from the Old Minster to the new one, "with great rejoicing and glory". On the feast-day of Saint Swithun (15 July), they processed from the new church to the old, and processed the feretrum of St. Swithun from it to the new church "with all honour". The next day, the bishop's men began demolishing the old church.  Demolition work was complete within the year, except for one porticus and the great altar. The following year more relics "of St. Swithun and of many other saints" were found under that altar and transferred to the new church.

Reformer
Walkelin also reformed the monastic community there, as did all Norman bishops in their new dioceses. In the words of the annalist of Winchester:

"He greatly improved the Church of Winton in devotion, in the number of its monks and in the buildings of the house (monastery)."

Death
Walkelin died 3 January 1098, at Winchester, and was buried in the nave of his cathedral, "before the steps under the rood-loft (pulpitum), in which stands the silver cross of Stigand, with the two great silver images; and he lies at the feet of William Giffard [his successor], having over him a marble stone" under the following inscription:
Praesul Walklynus istic requiescit humatus – Walkelin lies buried beneath here
Tempore Willelmi Conquestoris cathedratus – cathedral-builder in the time of William the Conqueror.

Notes

Citations

References
 British History Online Archbishops of York accessed on 2 November 2007
 British History Online Bishops of Winchester accessed on 2 November 2007
 British History Online Priors of Winchester accessed on 2 November 2007
 
 Spear, David S. "The Norman Empire and the Secular Clergy, 1066–1204" The Journal of British Studies Volume XXI Number 2 Spring 1982 p. 1-10

External links

 — The cathedral's construction
The Annalist

Bishops of Winchester
1098 deaths
11th-century English Roman Catholic bishops
Year of birth unknown
Burials at Winchester Cathedral
Norman clerics given benefices in England